Jean-Baptiste des Gallois de La Tour (unknown-1747) was a French public official. He served as the First President of the Parliament of Aix-en-Provence from 1735 to 1747. He is remembered for his relative tolerance of witchcraft and Protestantism.

Biography

Early life 
Jean-Baptiste des Gallois de La Tour was born in an old French aristocratic family from Forez.

Career 
He served as an Advisor in the Parliament of Paris, and later as an intendant in Brittany and Poitou.

He served as the last First President of the Parliament of Aix-en-Provence from 1748 to 1771, and from 1775 to 1790.

During the trial of the alleged witch Catherine Cadière and the Jesuit Fr Jean-Baptiste Girard (1680-1733), he was remarkably lenient.

Although he opposed the Protestant uprising in Cabrières-d'Aigues, it has been suggested that he did so humanely. Indeed, he appealed to Louis Phélypeaux, comte de Saint-Florentin (1707-1777) for clemency, adding that those were mostly peasants and they should not be fined too heavily, lest they became indigent.

Personal life 
He had a son, Charles Jean-Baptiste des Gallois de La Tour (1715-1802), who served as the last First President of the Parliament of Aix-en-Provence.

He died in 1747.

References 

1747 deaths
People from Aix-en-Provence
Year of birth missing